Lingua generalis was an essay written by Gottfried Leibniz in February, 1678 in which he presented a philosophical language he created, which he named lingua generalis or lingua universalis.

Leibniz aimed for his lingua universalis to be adopted as a universal language and be used for calculations. As a result of this work, he developed binary calculus.

References

See also
Constructed language

Constructed languages
International auxiliary languages
Constructed languages introduced in the 17th century
1678 works
Works by Gottfried Wilhelm Leibniz